Chimei Philharmonic Orchestra, formerly known as Chimei Symphony Orchestra, is a Taiwanese symphony orchestra organized in 2003 by Chi Mei Group, an international plastics producer and liquid crystal display maker.

In early 2007, they changed their name to Chimei Philharmonic Orchestra and appointed Lu Ching-ming the new music director.

Music directors and chief conductors
  Naoki Tokuoka (徳岡直樹), ?-2007
  Lu Ching-ming (呂景民), 2007–present

See also
 Evergreen Symphony Orchestra
 List of symphony orchestras in Taiwan

External links
  Chimei Philharmonic Orchestra at Chi-mei Museum official site

Taiwanese orchestras
Musical groups established in 2003
2003 establishments in Taiwan